Flower child originated as a synonym for hippie, especially among the idealistic young people who gathered in San Francisco and the surrounding area during the Summer of Love in 1967.  It was the custom of "flower children" to wear and distribute flowers or floral-themed decorations to symbolize ideals of universal belonging, peace, and love. The mass media picked up on the term and used it to refer in a broad sense to any hippie. Flower children were also associated with the flower power political movement, which originated in ideas written by Allen Ginsberg in 1965.

Origins

The term originated in the mid-1960s in the wake of a film version of H. G. Wells's The Time Machine that depicted flower-bestowing, communal people of the future in a story characterized by antiwar themes. American political activists like Allen Ginsberg and Abbie Hoffman advocated the giving of flowers as a means of peaceful protest. Images of flower-wielding protesters at the 1967 Pentagon March, such as Marc Riboud's image of Jan Rose Kasmir titled The Ultimate Confrontation: The Flower and the Bayonet and Bernie Boston's Pulitzer prize-nominated photograph Flower Power, popularized the association of flowers with the counterculture movement of the 1970s. Hippies embraced the symbolism by dressing in clothing with embroidered flowers and vibrant colors, wearing flowers in their hair, and distributing flowers to the public, becoming known as flower children.

San Francisco

John Phillips of The Mamas & the Papas wrote the song "San Francisco (Be Sure to Wear Flowers in Your Hair)" for his friend Scott McKenzie to promote the Monterey Pop Festival that Phillips was helping to organize. Released on May 13, 1967, the song's lyrics urged visitors to San Francisco to "wear some flowers in your hair", in keeping with the festival's billing as "three days of music, love, and flowers". The song was a popular hit, reaching number 4 on the music chart in the United States and number 1 in the United Kingdom and most of Europe, and became an unofficial anthem for hippies, flower power and the flower child concept.

Summer of Love 

After the January 14, 1967 Human Be-In organized by artist Michael Bowen (among other things, announcements told participants to bring flowers), as many as 100,000 young people from all over the world flocked to San Francisco's Haight-Ashbury district, Berkeley, and other Bay Area cities during the Summer of Love in search of different value systems and experiences. After the Monterey Pop Festival in June of 1967, the Summer of Love became a watershed event in the development of a worldwide 1960s counterculture when newly recruited flower children returned home at the end of the summer, taking with them new styles, ideas, and behaviors and introducing them in all major cities of the U.S. and western Europe.

Social analysis
In his book, Prometheus Rising, the philosopher Robert Anton Wilson suggested that the flower children could be viewed in Jungian terms as a collective social symbol representing the mood of friendly weakness. In 1995, The Sekhmet Hypothesis extended Wilson's idea into other pop cultural trends with other youth movements being compared to the moods of hostile weakness, friendly strength and hostile strength.

See also
 Baby boomers
 Carnation Revolution
 Counterculture of the 1960s
 Generation X
 Hippie
 History of the hippie movement
 Love beads

References

Further reading
'Flower Child' in the American Heritage Dictionary
Online Etymology Dictionary
Official Information on the single, San Francisco

Hippie movement
Counterculture
Counterculture of the 1960s
Haight-Ashbury, San Francisco
Flowers in culture

de:Blumenkind (Hippie)
it:Figli dei fiori
he:ילדי הפרחים